Utsarg Express is a daily Express train of the Indian Railways, running between Chhapra Junction, the prominent city of Bihar, and Farrukhabad(Hindi: फ़र्रूख़ाबाद, Urdu: فرخ آباد) is a city in the state of Uttar Pradesh in northern India.Uttar Pradesh.

Number & Nomenclature
The train numbers of the Utsarg Expresses are:
15083UP: From Chhapra Junction to Farrukhabad – 682 km/18:20 Hrs
15084DN: From Farrukhabad to Chhapra Junction – 682 km/18:00 Hrs

The name Utsarg means Devotion.

Route & Halts
15083– Chhapra Junction to Farrukhabad

Coach composition
The train generally consists of a total number of 23 coaches as follows:
 1 AC II Tier
 4 AC III Tier
 8 Sleeper
 8 Second Sitting
 2 Unreserved cum Luggage/Brake VAN

Locomotive
 It is hauled by a Izzatnagar-based WDP-4D locomotive end to end
 Loco reversal:

RSA – Rake sharing arrangement

This train shared its rake with 18181/18182 Tatanagar–Chhapra Express before COVID-19 pandemic in India and that time the train number of Utsarg Express was 18191/18192. Currently it shares its rake with 15053/15054 Chhapra–Lucknow Junction Express.

Trivia

This was the first broad-gauge express train incorporated after broad conversion of section Shahganj-Ballia.

See also
 Kaifiyat Express
 Chhapra Express

External links
 
 

Transport in Farrukhabad
Transport in Chhapra
Railway services introduced in 1992
Named passenger trains of India
Rail transport in Uttar Pradesh
Rail transport in Bihar
Express trains in India